Chezka Centeno (born June 30, 1999) is a Filipina billiards player from Zamboanga City.

Chezka was born to Fausto Albert and Josephine Centeno and is the sixth of seven children. She started playing billiards at five years old and her potential was discovered at age eight when she played in local tournaments in the family's hometown. At the age of 11, she entered the Philippine National Games and finished third. When she was 12, she was invited to the Kremlin Cup in Russia and finished in the top 32. After being recruited into the national team, Chezka participated at the 2014 Asian Junior Championship and won 1st place under the girls' single category.

She later won the nine-ball women's single at the 2015 Southeast Asian Games, facing her idol and fellow Filipina, Rubilen Amit in the final.

In 2016, Centeno participated in the Chinese Eight-Ball World Championship in China, together with Rubilen Amit and Iris Ranola.

Titles
 2015 WPA World Nine-ball Junior championship 
 2015 Southeast Asian Games Nine-ball Singles
 2016 WPA Amway Cup 9-Ball World Open
 2016 Chinook Winds Open 10-Ball Women's Division
 2017 Southeast Asian Games Nine-ball Singles
 2018 The Perfect Storm Open Women's Division
 2019 Southeast Asian Games Nine-ball Doubles
 2019 Southeast Asian Games Ten-ball Singles
 2022 APF Asian Women's 9-Ball Open

References

1999 births
Living people
Female pool players
Filipino pool players
Sportspeople from Zamboanga City
Southeast Asian Games gold medalists for the Philippines
Southeast Asian Games competitors for the Philippines
Southeast Asian Games medalists in cue sports
Competitors at the 2015 Southeast Asian Games
Competitors at the 2017 Southeast Asian Games
Competitors at the 2019 Southeast Asian Games
Southeast Asian Games silver medalists for the Philippines
Competitors at the 2021 Southeast Asian Games